State Route 151 (SR 151) is an east–west state highway in the eastern part of the U.S. state of Ohio. Its eastern terminus is at a diamond interchange with State Route 7 just south of Mingo Junction.

Route description
State Route 151 travels through Harrison and Jefferson Counties.  Only the segment of SR 151 that is concurrent with US 22 near Hopedale is included within the National Highway System.

History
When it was first established in 1924, State Route 151 consisted of what is now a stretch of State Route 212 between Sherrodsville and Bowerston and the current portion of State Route 151 between Bowerston and its current eastern terminus at State Route 7 near Mingo Junction.  In 1927, the western end of State Route 151 changed shape when the former stretch of State Route 151 between Sherrodsville and Bowerston became State Route 212, and what was State Route 212 heading southwest from Bowerston to the former State Route 6 (now U.S. Route 250) became a re-routing of State Route 151.  Consequently, State Route 151 took on the routing that it maintains to this day.

Major intersections

References

External links

151
Transportation in Harrison County, Ohio
Transportation in Jefferson County, Ohio